The Armstrong Browning Library & Museum, formerly known as the Armstrong Browning Library, is located on the campus of Baylor University in Waco, Texas, United States. It is the home of the largest collections of works by English poets Robert Browning and Elizabeth Barrett Browning. Additionally it is thought to house the largest collection of secular stained glass in the world.

History
The original collection of Browning works were donated to Baylor in 1918 by Dr. A.J. Armstrong. After the death of the Browning's only son Robert Barrett Browning and subsequent sale of their collection, Dr. Armstrong obtained a list of the items sold and their purchasers, and attempted to acquire the memorabilia via donation or purchase.

Dr. Armstrong's collection was originally housed in the Carroll Library. The Carroll Library was heavily damaged in a 1922 fire; none of the Browning works were lost, and a special room was subsequently built to house them.

However, by 1925 the collection had outgrown the space. In 1943, Baylor President Pat Neff donated US$100,000 toward a new library. Construction on the library (which would also house the English department) began in 1948 and the finished structure (costing US$1.75 million) was dedicated in 1951. The building was significantly renovated in 1995 to house an even larger collection (by then the English department had relocated) and refurbished in 2012.

References

External links

Armstrong Browning Library webpage
Baylor University website

University and college academic libraries in the United States
Libraries in Waco, Texas
Baylor University
Library buildings completed in 1951
Tourist attractions in Waco, Texas
Robert Browning
Special collections libraries in the United States